Patricio Nehuén Pérez (born 24 June 2000) is an Argentine professional footballer who plays as a centre-back for Serie A club Udinese and the Argentina national team.

Club career
Pérez joined Argentinos Juniors' system in 2007, after spells with La Quinta de Los Pibes and Unión de Tesei. He first appeared in the club's first-team squad under manager Alfredo Berti during the 2017–18 Argentine Primera División season which culminated with the defender making his debut in a Copa Argentina tie with Independiente de Chivilcoy on 9 May 2018. In July, Pérez was signed by La Liga's Atlético Madrid. He was immediately loaned back to Argentinos Juniors. Pérez was an unused substitute ten times in 2018–19, before making his league debut during a 2–1 defeat to Tigre on 12 November.

On 10 July 2019, Pérez joined the newly promoted Primeira Liga side Famalicão on a season-long loan. His opening appearance for them came in the Taça da Liga versus Covilhã on 3 August. He scored his first senior goal on 31 August, netting in a league victory away from home against Aves. He was named as the league's best defender for August. In total, Pérez appeared twenty-five times during his time with Famalicão as they placed sixth. He returned to his parent club ahead of the 2020–21 season, subsequently going unused on the bench for all three of Atlético's opening La Liga fixtures.

On 5 October 2020, Pérez was loaned to fellow La Liga side Granada. He made his debut on 25 October away to Getafe, which preceded his first UEFA Europa League appearances arriving on 5 November in Cyprus against Omonia.

On 28 August 2021, Pérez joined Italian side Udinese on a season-long loan. On 29 July 2022, he transferred to Udinese, signing a five-year contract.

International career
Pérez represented Argentina at U17 level, making four appearances at the 2017 South American U-17 Championship in Chile. He also trained with the senior squad in June 2017 and at the 2018 FIFA World Cup. In December 2018, Pérez was selected for the 2019 South American U-20 Championship. Fernando Batista called up Pérez for the subsequent 2019 FIFA U-20 World Cup in Poland, where he scored once in three games. Batista also picked Pérez for the U23s in the succeeding September for a Bolivia friendly. Pérez received his first senior call for November 2019 friendlies with Brazil and Uruguay.

Career statistics

Club

International

Honours
Argentina U23
 Pre-Olympic Tournament: 2020

References

2000 births
Living people
People from Hurlingham Partido
Argentine footballers
Argentina youth international footballers
Argentina under-20 international footballers
Association football defenders
Argentine expatriate footballers
Expatriate footballers in Spain
Expatriate footballers in Portugal
Expatriate footballers in Italy
Argentine expatriate sportspeople in Spain
Argentine expatriate sportspeople in Portugal
Argentine expatriate sportspeople in Italy
Argentine Primera División players
Primeira Liga players
La Liga players
Serie A players
Argentinos Juniors footballers
Atlético Madrid footballers
F.C. Famalicão players
Granada CF footballers
Udinese Calcio players
Olympic footballers of Argentina
Footballers at the 2020 Summer Olympics
Sportspeople from Buenos Aires Province